Maria Jeritza (born Marie Jedličková; 6 October 1887 – 10 July 1982) was a dramatic soprano, long associated with the Vienna State Opera (1912–1934 and 1950-1953) and the Metropolitan Opera (1921–1932 and 1951). Her rapid rise to fame, beauty and personality earned her the nickname "The Moravian Thunderbolt".

Biography

Jeritza was born in Brno, Moravia, then part of the Austro-Hungarian Empire, in 1887 as Marie Jedličková. She was trained at the Brno Conservatory, and later was a pupil of Estelle Liebling in New York City. In 1910, she made her debut as Elsa, in Wagner's Lohengrin, at Olomouc. The Emperor Franz Josef heard her and immediately ordered that she be offered a contract at the Imperial Hofoper, Vienna. 

She created the roles of Blanchefleur in Kienzl's opera Der Kuhreigen (1911), Ariadne in Strauss's Ariadne auf Naxos (1912), the Empress in his Die Frau ohne Schatten (1919), and Hariette/Juliette in Korngold's Die tote Stadt (Hamburg, 1920), though later became famous for her leading role of Marietta/Marie in the same opera in its January 1921 Vienna premiere, which was also the role in which she debuted at the Metropolitan Opera on 19 November 1921.

On 16 November 1926, she starred in the title role of Puccini's Turandot in its North American premiere at the Metropolitan, where she also created the title or leading soprano roles in Janáček's Jenůfa (1924), Wolf-Ferrari's I gioielli della Madonna (1925), Korngold's Violanta (1927), Richard Strauss's Die Ägyptische Helena (1928), and Suppé's Boccaccio (1931) and Donna Juanita (1932). 

She was as popular at the Metropolitan as in Vienna, especially as Tosca, Carmen and Massenet's Thaïs. She appeared in an early sound film Grossfürstin Alexandra for which Franz Lehár wrote the song 'Du und ich sind für einander bestimmt'.

Personal life and death
After a two-year marriage to a man named Friedrich Wiener, she married an Austrian, Leopold Salvator Freiherr Popper von Podhragy (1886-1986). She married her third husband in 1935, Hollywood mogul Winfield R. Sheehan, who died in 1945. In 1948, she married New Jersey businessman Irving Seery and moved to a mansion in the Forest Hill neighborhood of Newark, New Jersey, where she lived until her death in 1982, at the age of 94 in Orange, New Jersey. She was buried at Holy Cross Cemetery in North Arlington, New Jersey.

Jeritza made a number of 78-rpm recordings which testify to the high quality of her voice. Many of these recordings have been released on CD.

References

External links

 
 
 [ Erik Eriksson's Brief Biography of Maria Jeritza]
 Time Magazine review of Jeritza's Girl of the Golden West in 1929 in NY

1887 births
1982 deaths
Musicians from Brno
People from the Margraviate of Moravia
Musicians from Newark, New Jersey
Fonotipia Records artists
Victor Records artists
Österreichischer Kammersänger
Burials at Holy Cross Cemetery (North Arlington, New Jersey)
Austrian emigrants to the United States
Brno Conservatory alumni